Ishara (Išḫara) was the tutelary goddess of the ancient Syrian city of Ebla. The origin of  her name is unknown. Both Hurrian and West Semitic etymologies have been proposed, but they found no broad support and today it is often assumed that her name belongs to an unknown linguistic substrate.

Her cult had a wide reach across the ancient Near East. In addition to Ebla, she was also worshiped in cities such as Mari, Emar, Alalakh and Ugarit. From these Syrian cities the worship of Ishara spread to Mesopotamia. The Hurrians also adopted her into their pantheon after arriving in Syria, from which she found her way to the Hittite pantheon.

In various time periods and areas different functions were assigned to her. In Ebla she was the tutelary deity of the ruling family, but also a love goddess. In Mesopotamia the latter function lead to an association with Ishtar, and later Nanaya, Kanisurra and Gazbaba as well. In Hurrian religion she acquired the role of a goddess associated with the underworld and disease, and in that capacity she was closely associated with Allani, the Hurrian queen of the dead. She was also regarded as a goddess of divination and a divine guardian of oaths.

Name and origin
Initially researches ascribed Hurrian origin to Ishara, as well as a number of other Eblaite deities (Adamma, Ashtabi and Hebat), but further excavations in Ebla have shown that all of these deities are present in documents predating the Hurrian migrations to Syria. In the case of Ishara, the theory that she had pre-Hurrian origin has been present in scholarship since 1971. While Wilfred G. Lambert considered it possible that Ishara's name was connected to early Semitic root šhr (dawn), going as far as proposing this as explanation for her association with Ishtar, Lluis Feliu in a more recent study notes that the proposed Semitic etymologies for the name of Ishara "do not fit (...) [her] profile very well." Today it is assumed that she originated in a linguistic and religious substrate which was neither Semitic nor Hurrian, similar to a number of other Eblaite deities like Ashtabi, Kura, Adamma and NI-da-KUL (Hadabal). Alfonso Archi proposes that she was originally worshiped in the area east of the city of Ebla itself, but within its sphere of influence.

A bilingual lexical texts from Ebla explains the writing of Ishara's name as šara8(bara10 = gá×sig7)ra = Iš-ḫa-ra. Another spelling attested there was dŠÁR-iš.  Variants of the name include Ašḫara (in a treaty of Naram-Sin of Akkad with an Elamite king, possibly Hita of Awan), Ušḫara (in Hittite), and Ušḥry (in Ugaritic). In Alalakh, her name was written with the Akkadian logogram dIŠTAR. In some cases it is uncertain whether she, Ishtar or Shaushka (a Hurrian goddess whose name could also be written as dIŠTAR) was meant in personal names from that city containing the logogram.

Name of a month and personal names from Ebla involving the sign AMA were proposed to refer to Ishara in publications from the 1980s, but this possibility is not regarded as plausible anymore.

Functions
The oldest attestations of Ishara from Ebla, such as these in documents from the reign of Irkab-Damu, indicate she was a tutelary goddess of the ruling house. 

She is also already attested as a goddess of love in texts from Ebla, and Piotr Taracha goes as far as suggesting it was her oldest function. She was represented in this role in Mesopotamia as well, in part possibly due to association with Ishtar, though Frans Wiggermann regards the two of them as independent from each other in this role. As a love goddess, Ishara was specifically connected to the institution of marriage, though incantations associate her with erotic love as well. In Akkadian texts she could be referred to as the "lady of love," bēlet ru'āmi.'

Alfonso Archi notes that in Ebla she sometimes received weapons as offering (much like Hadad, Resheph and Hadabal), which might indicate she had an Ishtar-like warlike side too. He proposes that as a warrior goddess she was possibly associated with axes.

She was also strongly associated with divination and prophecy, as evidenced by the epithet bēlet bīrim ("lady of divination") known from Syrian sources and the god list An = Anum and references to "Ishara of the prophetesses" in texts from Emar.

A number of new functions were assigned to her in the Hurrian context, including an association with the underworld and gods dwelling in it. She was also invoked as a guardian of oaths. While she was generally not a healing goddess in her own right, she could serve as both a goddess of disease and of healing in Hurro-Hittite sources.

Symbols

Initially her symbol in Mesopotamia was the bashmu, otherwise mostly associated with underworld gods, such as Tishpak or Ninazu. An association between Ishara and mythical reptiles is also known from Ugarit, where a single text refers to "Ushara-Hulmizzu." Hulmizzu is agreed to be a cognate of Akkadian hulmittu, as well as a Hebrew term referring to a type of reptile in Leviticus 11:30 and the Syriac word hulmoto, "chameleon." While it has been translated simply as "the snake" or "the lizard," Aisha Rahmouni proposes that it designates not a real animal, but a mythical creature analogous to bashmu. She relies on descriptions of the appearance of the Akkadian hulmittu in lexical texts, which clarify that the term designates a mythical snake with legs. 

In later periods, for example  on boundary stones (kudurru) Ishara was instead symbolically represented by the scorpion. Neither the reason behind attribution of either symbol to her nor why the change from bashmu to scorpion occurred are known. Like her, scorpions were associated with marriage in Mesopotamian culture. In Babylonian astronomy, she was associated with the "scorpion star" (mulgir-tab). 

As a love goddess, Ishara could also be associated with cannabis.

Worship
Alfonso Archi describes the worship of Ishara as deeply rooted in the traditions of the kingdom of Ebla from the third millennium BCE. "Ishara of the king," a hypostasis meant to serve as a protector of the reigning Eblaite monarch, was worshiped in the temple of the city god Kura. The association between Ishara and Eblaite kingship persisted at least until the seventeenth century BCE. Later sources, including a Hurrian myth and an oracle text from Emar, still recognize her as the goddess of Ebla. 
Administrative texts indicate that multiple members of the Eblaite royal family and court were devotees of Ishara. As an extension of this role, she was worshiped during rituals connected to the royal wedding. During preparations for it, the future Eblaite queen was expected to make offerings to Ishara and Kura. The king instead made offerings to her after the return from the ceremony, which took place outside the city.

Another Eblaite document attests that Ishara was asked to purify the royal garden, though this location was more commonly associated with the god Ea.

No theophoric names invoking Ishara are known from Ebla, which according to Alfonso Archi is not uncommon for the deities presumed to belong to the religious substrate present in the documents from the same city, with Kura being an exception. He proposes that this situation indicates name giving patterns in Ebla reflected not the popular religion in the documented period, but rather a more archaic tradition. 

In Darib near Ebla, possibly to be identified with modern Atarib, Ishara was invoked in connection with the funerary cult of deceased Eblaite kings, alongside a god associated with this locality whose name is not preserved and the divine pairs of Hadabal and his nameless spouse, Resheph and Adamma and Agu and Guladu. One Eblaite document mentions that two further locations where Ishara was worshiped were Zidara and Guwanu. 

Yet another settlement attested in the Ebla texts where Ishara was a major deity was Mane, located on the Euphrates in the proximity of Emar. The city, and by extension a hypostasis of Ishara associated with it, were politically significant for the kings of Ebla, as it constituted their main harbor on the Euphrates. She was worshiped there alongside Šanugaru/Šanggar, a god who likely had lunar character, who was also associated with her in Emar and Ugarit in the late Bronze Age. 

Another city in Syria where Ishara was already worshiped in the Ebla period, around 2400 BCE, was Nabada (Tell Beydar), where a month in the local calendar was named after her. The major deities of Ebla like Kura or Hadabal are otherwise almost entirely absent from the pantheon of Nabada. 

In known texts from Mari Ishara is the third most frequent goddess when it comes to appearances in theophoric names of women. Alfonso Archi concludes that she must had been popular in the sphere of personal religion in the area under the influence of that city. Similar theophoric names are also known from Terqa, Tuttul and Ekalte, though they were less frequent in these cities than in Mari. 

In the late Bronze Age in Emar Ishara was celebrated alongside the city god (dNIN.URTA) during a so-called kissu festival. She is also present in descriptions of the analogous festival dedicated to Dagan, alongside deities such as Shuwala and Ugur. The nature of these celebrations remain uncertain. Curse formulas from Emar pair her with deities such as the city god, the storm god, Dagan or Ninkarrak.

Hurrian reception

Due to being worshiped in many locations in Syria in the third and second millennia BCE, Ishara was also incorporated into the Hurrian pantheon. Texts from Ugarit written in Hurrian enumerate the following centers of Ishara worship: "Mari, Tuttul with Emar-Sirašše, Mudkin-Nidabe, Yablā-Ališe, Naštarbenne-Šidurašše, Tunanah-Šaydar and Ugarit-Zulude." She was also worshiped in Alalakh, a Hurrianized city in western Syria. She was called the "Lady of Alalakh," as indicated by an inscription of king Idrimi.  According to Piotr Taracha, she was the third most important deity in the pantheon of that city, after the storm god (Teshub) and the sun god (Shimige). Theophoric names with Ishara as an element attested in documents from Alalakh are mostly Hurrian.

A temple of Ishara in the Hurrian kingdom of Kizzuwatna was located on a mountain bearing her name.  During the hišuwa festival from that area, meant to guarantee good fortune for the royal couple, she received offerings alongside "Teshub Manuzi," Lelluri, Allani, two Nupatik gods (pibithi - "of Pibid(a)" and zalmathi - "of Zalman(a)/Zalmat") and Maliya. Instructions for this celebration state the statue of Ishara is to be covered with a red draped garment, while that of Allani with an identical blue one. Another Kizzuwatnean festival, dedicated specifically to Ishara, took place in autumn. 

Hittite texts pertaining to Hurrian religion sometimes use the name "Hamri-Išhara" to refer to her, presumably due to her role as an oath goddess which developed in connection to hamri buildings in Kizzuwatna. Military oaths were particularly closely associated with her.

In purification rituals and oaths she was commonly associated with the moon god (Hurrian Kušuḫ, Anatolian Arma). They were believed to punish oath-breakers, mostly by the means of various diseases. The Hittite verb išharišh- referred to being inflicted with such an "Ishara illness." However, Ishara could also be placated with offerings and serve as a healing goddess.

Mesopotamian reception
In the third millennium BCE Ishara reached Mesopotamia, most likely with Mari serving as the intermediary. The oldest evidence comes from the Akkadian period, during which Ishara appears in personal names and in a treaty with Elam. Other Mesopotamian deities invoked in the latter document alongside Elamite ones include Manzat, Ilaba, Ninkarrak and Ninurta.

She continued to be worshiped in the Ur III period, and shared temples with Belet Nagar in Ur and with Dagan in Nippur. During the reign of Shu-Sin, she received offerings at the royal court in Ur. In the same period, she was worshiped during the erabbatum ceremony, possibly representation occasions when a deity was believed to enter the corresponding temple after a period spent outside it, for example during rituals held in the king's palace. There is presently no evidence that the worship of Ishara was already widespread in Mesopotamia in this period, however.

Other settlements from which the Mesopotamian cult of Ishara is attested include Sippar, Kish, Larsa, Urum, Tell al-Rimah and Babylon. She is also attested in personal names from the Chogha Gavaneh site in western Iran, which in the early second millennium BCE was a predominantly Akkadian settlement possibly connected to the kingdom of Eshnunna. 

One Babylonian divination manual explaining how to interpret the signs on the carcass of a bird sacrifice identified one possible location as the position of Ishara and Ḫišamītum. It also mentions other deities of western origin, such as Allatum (Allani).

As early as in the Akkadian period Ishara, alongside Ishtar, appears in love incantations. In later periods they were invoked in them alongside Nanaya, Kanisurra and Gazbaba as well. Some of these texts use formulas such as "at the command of Kanisurra and Ishara, patron goddess of love" or "at the command of Kanisurra and Ishara, patroness of sex."  As noted by Gioele Zisa, Ishara's domain appears to be erotic love in this case. The Epic of Gilgamesh, as well as Atrahasis, nonetheless attest that Ishara was also viewed as a goddess associated with marriage in Mesopotamia. In a number of known love incantations, Ishara is paired with almanu, a common noun of uncertain meaning whose proposed translations include "widower," "man without family obligations," or perhaps simply "lover." In one case the term is written with a divine determinative, as if it were the proper name of a deity. Ishara and almanu occur in parallel with Ishtar and Dumuzi and Nanaya and an unnamed lover.

Ishara continued to be worshiped in Babylon in the first millennium BCE. Her temple in that city was Eshasurra, "house of the womb," which according to Andrew R. George can be identified with the building designated as "temple Z" during excavations. A late hymn to Nanaya refers to Ishara as one of the goddesses worshiped in Kish.

In Assyria Ishara was worshiped in the temple of Ishtar Assuritum ("Assyrian Ishtar") in Assur in a chapel rebuilt by Adad-Nirari I. It is also possible that the goddess Iblaitu mentioned in the takultu ritual was analogous to her.

Association with other deities
According to Alfonso Archi Ishara was one of the three commonly worshiped Hurrian goddesses regarded as unmarried, the other two being Allani and Shaushka. Lluis Felieu notes that while Ishara was associated with various male deities in different time periods and locations, most evidence does not indicate that she was believed to have a permanent spouse in other traditions either.

In Hurrian tradition she was viewed as a daughter of Enlil. Two deities are addressed as parents of Ishara in the proemium of the Song of Kumarbi. Gary Beckman restores their names as "Enlil and Apantu," though in the same composition Enlil is paired with his wife Ninlil. Alfonso Archi in his translation of the same passage chooses to leave the names blank.

A single Mesopotamian text commenting on magical formulas meant to protect a house from supernatural invaders refers to the Sebitti as sons of Ishara, but assyriologist Frans Wiggermann, who studied this group of gods extensively, assumes that this is only a result of confusion between her and similarly named underworld god Enmesharra, whose children these seven deities were more frequently identified as.

In Hurrian context, as an underworld deity, Ishara was closely associated with Allani and the so-called "former gods," an ancestral generation of deities residing in "Dark Earth," the Hurrian underworld. The association between Ishara and Allani is already present in documents from the Ur III period. Veneration of them as a pair was an example of a broader phenomenon frequently attested in Hurrian sources, the worship of pairs of deities with similar spheres of influence as dyads. Other examples include Shaushka's attendants Ninatta and Kulitta, the fate goddesses Hutena and Hutellura, Hebat and her son Sarruma, and the astral deities  Pinikir and DINGIR.GE6, so-called Goddess of the Night.

A deity named Halma occurs in Ishara's entourage in Kizzuwatna. Halma is also attested in documents from Emar and possibly in the Persepolis Fortification Archive, though it is possible that the latter is an otherwise unattested Elamite deity with an accidentally similar name. Another god associated with Ishara in the same rituals was Saggar, assumed to be analogous to the Eblaite Sanugaru, who was worshiped with Ishara in Mane in the third millennium BCE already. Saggar was likely a moon god. Volkert Haas identifies him specifically as a divine representation of the lunar crescent. Other moon gods were associated with Ishara in Hurro-Hittite oath formulas. 

The god list An = Anum places Ishara in the circle of Enlil. It also states that she had a female attendant (munusSUKKAL) named Tašme-zikru (Akkadian: "She answered my word" or "She answered the word"). This minor goddess is also attested in the Isin god list. The compilers of An = Anum additionally labeled Saggar as the spouse of Ishara. A further Mesopotamian deity associated with her was the incantation goddess Ningirima, who shared her connection with snakes and with the "scorpion star". 

A few sources attest an association between Ishara and the medicine goddess Ninkarrak, including an Old Assyrian treaty, a curse formula from Emar and a god list from Mari.  Additionally both appear, though not next to each other, in Naram-Sin's treaty with Elam.  This connection most likely was rooted in their shared origin in Syria. In An = Anum, the name Meme is applied both to Ishara and to Ninkarrak.

Ishara and Ishtar
Ishtar (written logographically as dINANNA or syllabically as dAš-dar) already appears alongside Ishara in the Ebla texts. In a ritual performed by the royal couple involving statues of both of them she is referred to as Labutu, a name cognate with the Akkadian word lābatu ("lioness"), a common epithet of Ishtar. A theophoric name, Ishara-ki-Ishtar, "Ishara is like Ishtar," indicates they were also seen as similar in popular religion in the upper Euphrates area. The association between both of them and the western Ashtart is well attested in god lists from Ugarit. 

Ishtar and Ishara were also associated with each other in Mesopotamia as goddesses of love. However, as pointed out by Joan Goodnick Westenholz, a passage from Atrahasis commonly used in modern literature to argue the two goddesses were one and the same in Mesopotamian perception does not actually state that Ishtar was Ishara, as the noun ištar is not preceded by the dingir sign, so-called "divine determinative," in it, and as such should be translated as the generic term "goddess" rather than as the theonym Ishtar. The use of ištar or ištarum or as a common noun which could refer to any goddess, a synonym of iltum, the feminine form of ilu ("god"), goes back to the Old Babylonian period. To differentiate it from the name Ishtar, it was consistently written without the divine determinative.

Ishara and Dagan
While Wilfred G. Lambert proposed in 1980 that Ishara was sometimes regarded as the wife of Dagan, and this theory is repeated as fact in older reference works such as Jeremy Black's and Anthony Green's Gods, Demons and Symbols of Ancient Mesopotamia, in a more recent study Lluís Feliu arrived to the opposite conclusions. The association between them was limited to sharing temples in southern Mesopotamia, and most likely was rooted only in their shared western origin and the resulting "foreign" status in the eyes of Mesopotamian theologians, as indicated by the fact it is not attested outside Babylonia. Sources from ancient sites in modern Syria, where both deities were more commonly worshiped and held a higher position in the pantheon, do not indicate a strong connection between them. Feliu additionally points out that Lambert relying on this assumption also wrongly concluded Ishara was one and the same as Haburitum, a goddess who represented the river Khabur who is also attested in association with Dagan in Mesopotamia. He notes that Haburitum and Ishara at times appear in the same documents, and cannot be the same deity. This view is also supported by Alfonso Archi. He considers it more likely that Haburitum was analogous to Belet Nagar. Like Feliu, he assumes it is not plausible that Ishara was ever regarded as Dagan's wife, at least partially because of her Ishtar-like characteristics.

Myths
Ishara appears in a myth known from an original Hurrian version and a Hittite translation, known as the Epic of Freeing or Song of Release, discovered in Hattusa in 1983, with further fragments recovered in 1985. She is introduced alongside Allani, with both of them being referred to as "young woman" (Hurrian: šiduri). Ishara is also addressed as "wordmaker, famous for her wisdom." Later, in a very fragmentary passage, she seemingly negotiates the fate of the city with an envoy of Teshub, who wishes to destroy it because the Eblaites refuse to free the inhabitants of the city Igingallish. The text is most likely an etiological explanation of the historical destruction of Ebla. 

Ishara also appears in the proemium of the Song of Kumarbi, part of a Hurrian cycle of myths about the eponymous god, as one of the deities invited to listen to narrator's tale.Epic of Gilgamesh and Atrahasis'' both mention Ishara in passing as a goddess of marriage.

References

Bibliography

Eblaite deities
Hittite deities
Hurrian deities
Inanna
Love and lust goddesses
Mesopotamian goddesses
Plague gods
Ugaritic deities
Underworld goddesses